Bobasatrania is an extinct genus of prehistoric bony fish that survived the Permian-Triassic extinction event. Fossils of Bobasatrania were found in beds of Changhsingian (late Permian) to Ladinian (Middle Triassic) age. It was most speciose during the Early Triassic. The genus was named after the locality Bobasatrana in northeast Madagascar, from where the type species was described. 

The genus originated during the late Permian, survived the Permian-Triassic extinction event, and underwent a speciation event during the Triassic (approx 240M years BP) in the shallow coastal waters off the Pangaean supercontinent. Their fossils are therefore found throughout the world, with some of the best examples coming from the Wapiti Lake region of British Columbia, Canada.

They have a distinctive diamond-shaped body, forked tail and long thin pectoral fins. The structure of their teeth suggests they fed on small shelled animals.

See also
 Prehistoric fish
 List of prehistoric bony fish

References

Further reading
 Nielsen, Eigil. 1942. Studies on Triasslc Fishes from East Greenland. I. Glaucolepis and Boreosomus. Palaeozoologica Groenlandica. vol. I.
 Nielsen, Eigil. 1947. Studies on Triassic Fishes from East Greenland. II. Australosomus and Birgeria. Palaeozoologica Groenlandica. vol. III. 204 Medd, fra Dansk Geol. Forening. København. Bd. 12. [1952].
 Stensiö, E. A:EON, 1921. Triassic Fishes from Spitsbergen. Part I. Vienna.
 Stensiö, E. 1932. Triassic Fishes from East Greenland. Medd. om Grønland, Bd. 83, Nr. 3. 
 Stensiö, E. 1947. The sensory Lines and dermal Bones of the Cheek in Fishes and Amphibians. Stockholm, Kungl. Sv. Vet. Akad. Handl., ser. 3, Bd. 22, no. 1.
 Watson, D . M. S., 1928. On some Points in the Structure of Palaeonlscid and allied Fish. London, Zool. Soc. Proc, pt. 1.
 Bürgin, T. 1992. Basal ray-finned fishes (Osteichthyes; Actinopterygii) from the Middle Triassic of Monte San Giorgio (Canton Tessin, Switzerland). Schweizerische Paläontologische Abhandlungen 114:1-164.

Prehistoric fish of Africa
Prehistoric fish of North America
Prehistoric fish of Europe

Prehistoric ray-finned fish genera